Petrakovo is a rural locality (a village) in Karinskoye Rural Settlement, Alexandrovsky District, Vladimir Oblast, Russia. The population was 8 as of 2010. There are 2 streets.

Geography 
Petrakovo is located on the Maly Kirzhach River, 23 km southeast of Alexandrov (the district's administrative centre) by road. Romanovskoye is the nearest rural locality.

References 

Rural localities in Alexandrovsky District, Vladimir Oblast
Alexandrovsky Uyezd (Vladimir Governorate)